Zhushikou station is an interchange station on Line 7 and Line 8 of the Beijing Subway.

The Line 7 station was opened on December 28, 2014. The Line 8 station was opened on December 30, 2018. This station served as the temporary northern terminus of the south section of line 8 until December 31, 2021, when both north and south sections of Line 8 were connected.

Station Layout 
Both the line 7 and 8 stations have underground island platforms. The line 7 platforms are located a level under the line 8 platforms.

Exits 
There are six exits, lettered A, C, D, E, F, and G. Exit D is accessible.

Gallery

References

Railway stations in China opened in 2014
Beijing Subway stations in Dongcheng District
Beijing Subway stations in Xicheng District